Arbanitis beaury is a species of armoured trap-door spider in the family Idiopidae, and is endemic to New South Wales. 

It was first described by Robert Raven & Graham Wishart in 2006.

References

Idiopidae
Spiders described in 2006
Spiders of Australia
Fauna of New South Wales
Taxa named by Robert Raven